The Middle American indigo snake (Drymarchon melanurus), also known commonly as the blacktail cribo, is a species of large, nonvenomous, snake in the family Colubridae. The species is native to the southwestern United States, Mexico, Central America, and northern South America. In addition to the nominotypical subspecies, it has four other recognized subspecies, including D. m. erebennus commonly known as the Texas indigo snake.

Description
This species has predominantly olive-brown glossy dorsal scales evolving to black at the tail. The underside is a lighter olive-yellow, olive-tan color.
D. melanurus has distinctive dark markings round the eyes, a vertical dark slash just behind the jaw. and a heavy diagonal dark slash on both sides of the neck.
The subspecies D. m. erebennus is predominantly solid black, though there can be lighter shaded variations.

Geographic range and habitat
The geographic range of D. melanurus extends from southern Texas southwards through the Gulf Coast of Mexico, the Yucatan peninsula, Guatemala and Belize. On the Pacific coast its range extends from Sinaloa in Mexico, southward to Guatemala, as far as Colombia, Venezuela and Ecuador. Its elevational distribution goes from near sea level up to around 1,900 m asl (6,230 feet).
The subspecies D. m. erebennus is found in southern Texas and southwards into Mexico as far as Veracruz.

Subspecies
There are five subspecies of D. melanurus which are recognized as being valid, including the nominate subspecies.
Drymarchon melanurus erebennus  
Drymarchon melanurus melanurus 
Drymarchon melanurus orizabensis 
Drymarchon melanurus rubidus 
Drymarchon melanurus unicolor 

Nota bene: A trinomial authority in parentheses indicates that the subspecies was originally described in a genus other than Drymarchon.

References

Further reading
Dugès A (1905). "Description d'un Ophidien nouveau du Mexique ( Morenoa orizabensis, g. et sp. nn.) ". Proceedings of the Zoological Society of London 1905 (2): 517-518. (Morenoa orizabensis, new species, pp. 517–5-8, Text-figure 77). (in French).
Duméril A-M-C, Bibron G, Duméril A[-H-A] (1854). Erpétologie générale ou histoire naturelle complète des reptiles. Tome septième. Première partie. Comprenant l'histoire des serpents non venimeux. Paris: Roret. xvi + 780 pp. (Spilotes melanurus, new species, pp. 224–225). (in French).
Heimes, Peter (2016). Snakes of Mexico: Herpetofauna Mexicana Vol. I. Frankfurt, Germany: Chimaira. 572 pp. .
Smith HM (1941). "A review of the subspecies of the indigo snake (Drymarchon corais)". Journal of the Washington Academy of Sciences 31: 466-481. (Drymarchon corais rubidus, new subspecies, pp. 474–476; Drymarchon corais unicolor, new subspecies, pp. 470–472).

Colubrids
Reptiles of the United States
Reptiles of Mexico
Reptiles of Guatemala
Reptiles of Belize
Reptiles of Honduras
Reptiles of Nicaragua
Reptiles of Costa Rica
Reptiles of Panama
Reptiles of Colombia
Reptiles of Venezuela
Reptiles of Ecuador
Reptiles described in 1854
Taxa named by André Marie Constant Duméril
Taxa named by Gabriel Bibron
Taxa named by Auguste Duméril